Milltownpass Bog is a peat bog in County Westmeath, Ireland. The bog is near the village of Milltownpass on the R446 regional road.

As a raised bog of ecological interest, it has been declared a Natural Heritage Area.

See also
Milltownpass
Bog of Allen
Cloncrow Bog

References

Bogs of the Republic of Ireland
Landforms of County Westmeath
Natural Heritage Areas of the Republic of Ireland